Northbrook is a commuter railroad station on Metra's Milwaukee District North Line in Northbrook, Illinois. In Metra's zone-based fare system, Northbrook is in zone E. As of 2018, Northbrook is the 28th busiest of Metra's 236 non-downtown stations, with an average of 1,259 weekday boardings. Metra trains pass through about every hour in each direction outside of rush hours, and up to every 20 minutes during rush hour. Bike racks are available at the station, on either side of the tracks. in 2016, an electrified sign was installed, warning commuters and pedestrians to look for trains. The tracks that run through Northbrook are also utilized by Amtrak's Hiawatha and Empire Builder, as well as freight trains.

As of December 12, 2022, Northbrook is served by 47 trains (22 inbound, 25 outbound) on weekdays, by all 20 trains (10 in each direction) on Saturdays, and by all 18 trains (nine in each direction) on Sundays and holidays.

Northbrook station was originally built by the Chicago, Milwaukee, St. Paul and Pacific Railroad. Parking is available both on Shermer Road and Lorenz Drive.

Bus connections
Pace
 422  Linden CTA/Glenview/Northbrook Court (weekdays only)

References

External links
Metra - Milwaukee District North - Northbrook 
SubwayNut - Chicago - Metra - Northbrook 
Station from Shermer Road from Google Maps Street View

Metra stations in Illinois
Former Chicago, Milwaukee, St. Paul and Pacific Railroad stations
Northbrook, Illinois
Railway stations in Cook County, Illinois
Railway stations in the United States opened in 1967